Moulay Ahmed Medeghri Airport , also known as Laghouat Airport, is an airport near Laghouat, Algeria.

Airlines and destinations

References

External links 
 
 
 OurAirports - Laghouat

Airports in Algeria
Buildings and structures in Laghouat Province